Suparman (6 March 1913 – 14 October 1948) was the first minister of justice of the State of Pasundan.

Suparman was born in 1913 at Sagalaherang, Purwakarta. In 1937, he graduated from the Rechtshoogeschool te Batavia (now the Faculty of Law of the University of Indonesia) and earned the Master of Laws degree (meester in de rechten). After he graduated, he became an advocate and procurator in Cirebon until his appointment as the Minister of Justice.

During the Japanese occupation, Suparman took office as a notary and as a social affairs officer. After the independence of Indonesia, Suparman became the Head of Office for Social Affairs in Cirebon. After the first Dutch military aggression, he became a social affairs officer again.

He was appointed as the Minister of Justice by Prime Minister Adil Puradiredja on 8 May 1948.

He died in a car crash during his working trip to Cirebon on 14 October 1948. His position was replaced by Tan Hwat Tiang four days later.

Bibliography

References

1913 births
1948 deaths
Justice ministers
People from Purwakarta Regency